Pitch Black Afro (Thulani Ngcobo) is a South African Kwaito/Hip Hop MC from Soweto. He found rapping a successful way to control his stutter, and commonly wears an Afro wig.

Pitch Black Afro's style is similar to that of American MC's, citing Redman as an influence, but raps in English, Zulu and a slangy mixture of different languages called tsotsi taal.

He became a favourite on the club scene often playing with "The Native Huts Allstars" and was eventually discovered by DJ Cleo during a stint doing "Rap Activity Jams" on YFM radio. His first album was produced by Cleo and released in 2004, selling 50,000 copies in South Africa with hit singles Pitch Black Afro, Matofotofo & A Day In My Life. This made his debut album, Styling Gel, the biggest ever selling African Hip Hop album at the time, until Cassper Nyovest released his debut album Tsholofelo in 2014 which went platinum sales since Pitch Black Afro and another South African rapper Emtee broke Cassper's record after he released his album Avery which went double platinum that was first on S.A hip hop. He followed this with his second album "Split Enz" in 2006.

In 2006, Pitch Black Afro was accused of assaulting a fan and causing damage to property in a Johannesburg mall.

Pitch Black Afro was arrested on the 9th of January 2019 for allegedly murdering his wife on new years eve in 2018. He was charged (in the Magistrates Court of Johannesburg, held at Johannesburg) with premeditated murder and defeating the ends of justice.

He has since been sentenced to 5 years in jail for the murder of his wife.

Recordings 

 2004 - Styling Gel 
 2006 - Split Endz
 2009 - Zonke Bonke!!!
 Int'emnandi

Notes

External links
 Official Facebook Page
 Pitch Black Afro on youtube

South African hip hop musicians
Living people
1979 births